Glen Gerald Charles (born February 18, 1943) and Les Charles (born March 25, 1948) are American screenwriters and television producers, best known for Taxi and Cheers.

Early life and careers
The Charles brothers attended University of Redlands. Glen graduated in 1965, and Les graduated in 1971. Glen began his professional life as an advertising copywriter but moved into television. Both Glen and Les began their television careers together as writers for M*A*S*H. They later wrote for The Mary Tyler Moore Show, Phyllis and The Bob Newhart Show, and were head writers and producers on the TV series Taxi. They then formed the Charles-Burrows-Charles production company with James Burrows, and created and produced the television series Cheers. The brothers also co-wrote the screenplay for the 1999 film Pushing Tin. Both were credited in every episode of Frasier as the creators of the "Frasier Crane" character from Cheers.

Cheers
Cheers is a sitcom that ran on NBC from September 30, 1982, to May 20, 1993, with a total of 275 half-hour episodes for eleven seasons. The show was produced by Charles/Burrows/Charles Productions in association with Paramount Network Television. The show is set in a bar named Cheers in Boston, Massachusetts, where a group of locals meet to drink, relax, and socialize. The Cheers finale aired on May 20, 1993, and was watched in an estimated 42.4 million households across the country.

Filmography

Personal lives 
They were raised in Henderson, Nevada, as members of the Church of Jesus Christ of Latter-day Saints.

References

External links

 

Living people
American television writers
American male television writers
American television producers
University of Redlands alumni
San Francisco State University alumni
Showrunners
Primetime Emmy Award winners
Writers Guild of America Award winners
Latter Day Saints from Nevada
People from Henderson, Nevada
Place of birth missing (living people)
Screenwriters from Nevada
Screenwriting duos
Sibling duos
Year of birth missing (living people)